Torben Müsel (born 25 July 1999) is a German professional footballer who plays as an attacking midfielder and forward for  club Rot-Weiss Essen.

Club career

1. FC Kaiserslautern
Born in Grünstadt, Müsel grew up in Obrigheim in the Rhineland-Palatinate. He started playing football in the neighbouring town with SV Obersülzen. In 2006, he moved to the youth academy of 1. FC Kaiserslautern, where he signed his first professional contract ahead of the 2017–18 season.

Müsel made his professional debut on 25 September 2017 in a 5–0 away defeat against 1. FC Union Berlin in the 2. Bundesliga. He was in the starting eleven for the first time on 16 December in the home game against 1. FC Nürnberg, which ended 1–1.

Borussia Mönchengladbach
After Kaiserslautern suffered relegated to the 3. Liga, Müsel signed with Bundesliga club Borussia Mönchengladbach for the 2018–19 season. He appeared for the reserve team during his first season and played 30 games in the Regionalliga West. Müsel made his debut in the Bundesliga on 20 June 2020 when he came on as a late substitute for Breel Embolo in the 3–1 away win over SC Paderborn. His second appearance came a year later, on 20 November 2021, in a 4–0 home win over Greuther Fürth.

On 18 January 2022, Müsel signed a contract extension with Borussia until June 2024. At the same time, Müsel was sent on a six month loan for the remainder of the 2021–22 season to Belgian First Division A club Eupen.

Rot-Weiss Essen
On 30 January 2023, Müsel signed a contract with Rot-Weiss Essen until June 2024.

International career
Müsel has played for Germany at youth level, and has been capped at U18, U19 and U20-level.

References

1999 births
Living people
People from Grünstadt
Association football forwards
German footballers
Germany youth international footballers
Footballers from Rhineland-Palatinate
1. FC Kaiserslautern players
Borussia Mönchengladbach II players
K.A.S. Eupen players
Rot-Weiss Essen players
Bundesliga players
2. Bundesliga players
Regionalliga players
Belgian Pro League players
German expatriate footballers
Expatriate footballers in Belgium
German expatriate sportspeople in Belgium